The 2022 World Judo Championships was held at the Humo Ice Dome in Tashkent, Uzbekistan, from 6 to 13 October 2022 as part of the IJF World Tour and during the 2024 Summer Olympics qualification period, concluding with the mixed team event on its final day.

Scheduling
The competition was originally scheduled to take place from 7 to 14 August 2022. Having been postponed by two months, its newly initially rescheduled third and fourth day would have coincided with Yom Kippur. Moshe Ponte, President of the Israel Judo Association cited this new schedule as problematic, saying that he would "handle it" with the International Judo Federation. Two days later, it was published that the competition will be postponed by an extra four days.

Schedule
All times are local (UTC+5).The event aired freely on the live.ijf.org website.

Medal summary

Medal table

Men's events

Women's events

Mixed events

Prize money
The sums written are per medalist, bringing the total prizes awarded to €798,000 for the individual events and €200,000 for the team event.

References

External links
 

 
World Judo Championships
World Championships
World Championships
Judo World Championships
International sports competitions hosted by Uzbekistan
Sports competitions in Tashkent
Judo World Championships